Swiss Cottage is a London Underground station at Swiss Cottage, north London. It lies in Travelcard Zone 2 and is located at the junction of Finchley Road, Avenue Road and College Crescent. The station is a local station, with the Metropolitan Line bypassing the station nearby.

History

It is named after a nearby pub built in 1803–4, originally called The Swiss Tavern and later renamed Swiss Cottage.

The new station initially operated as part of a combined station with the Metropolitan line's adjacent sub-surface Swiss Cottage station (platforms 1 and 2 were Metropolitan line and 3 and 4 were Bakerloo line), but the Metropolitan line station was closed on 17 August 1940. The Bakerloo line station was subsequently transferred—along with the rest of the Stanmore branch—to the Jubilee line when it opened on 1 May 1979.

The station was used extensively during The Blitz of World War II as an air raid shelter.

Connections
London Buses routes 13, 31, 46, 113, 187, 268, 603 and C11 and night routes N28, N31 and N113 serve the station.

Gallery

References

External links
London Transport Museum Photographic Archive

Jubilee line stations
London Underground Night Tube stations
Tube stations in the London Borough of Camden
Railway stations in Great Britain opened in 1939
Swiss Cottage